A class president, also known as a class representative, is usually the leader of a student body class, and presides over its class cabinet or organization within a student council. In a grade school, class presidents are generally elected by the class, a constituency composed of all students in a grade level.

The practice of electing a class president is common in many countries around the world.

While a class president is similar to a student government president in certain ways, the main difference between the two positions is that a class president usually only represents a specific grade within the school while the student government president represents the school's entire student body (for which reason they are sometimes called "student body president" or "school president"). Studies have shown that co-ed schools are more likely to have male students as class presidents than female students.

Duties and term 
The primary duties of the class president usually include working with students to resolve problems, and informing school leaders and the student council of ideas emanating from the class.  The president also has the responsibility of leading class cabinet meetings and organizing student activities and events.  The term of office for a class president is one year in most schools.  The student holding the office usually has the option of running again for the coming year.  Also, the class president in some schools is in charge of building funds for the class to use for activities, such as prom. Students in this position are also often looked to as token student voice representatives.

Senior-class president
In some schools, there is a senior-class president. The senior-class president is elected by popular vote and serves as the leader of the senior class in a high school or college. They are sometimes responsible for planning some of the events surrounding graduation.  After graduation, the senior-class president is often put in charge of planning class reunions in the years to come. In addition, being a class president is a position wherein one needs to be responsible inside the room. A class president will also develop leadership skills considering the daily task being given to them by the teachers and other persons. Standing in this position will emboss them as a yearning individual as well as a more prominent and knowledgeable person over time. They can conduct the rules inside the class they are in and serve as the top eye of their fellow classmates to initiate an excellent environment throughout the year.

Popular culture references
The stereotype of the class president has been typecast in books, movies and television.  Typical storylines sometimes contain a nerd or underdog claiming the title from a more popular student.  The stereotype has also been used as a political allegory since the early 20th century, describing everyone from the president of the United States to roles for African-American women in the U.S. Congress.

Fictional characters in the role of class president have included:

Pedro Sánchez, played by Efren Ramirez, runs successfully for Class President in the 2004 movie Napoleon Dynamite.
Zach Siler, played by Freddie Prinze Jr., is the popular jock and Class President in the 1999 film She's All That.
Wilford "Wil C" Cardon is the Class President in the independent film produced by DJ Iggy, titled, The Rise of Number 45.
Jessie Spano, played by Elizabeth Berkley, is the Class President at Bayside High School in the television series Saved by the Bell.
Ryoko Asakura in The Melancholy of Haruhi Suzumiya.
Tracy Flick, played by Reese Witherspoon, runs for Class President in the 1999 film Election.
Steve Holt, played by Justin Grant Wade, is Class President of the high school that George Michael Bluth and Maeby Funke attend in the television series Arrested Development.
Mizuki Kirimiya from the Visual Novel Yume Miru Kusuri.
Courtney from Total Drama Island ran for class president prior to applying for the show.
In the popular manga and anime My Hero Academia  there are two classes in the Hero department. Each has their own class president (called representatives). The representative of Class 1A is Tenya Iida and the representative of Class 1B is Itsuka Kendo. The vice representatives of 1A and 1B are Momo Yaoyorozu and Nirengeki Shoda respectively.

List of well-known class presidents
 Jane Addams
 Molly Dewson
 Troy H. Middleton
 Richard Nixon
 Ronald Reagan
 George H. W. Bush
 Bill Clinton
  Joe Biden
 Adam J. Niciewski
 Oprah Winfrey

See also 
 School Captain
 Head girl and head boy

References

External links
Blogspot.com, profile on Inconvenient Bluth
 www.schoolelectioncentral.com

Students' unions